Deepak Kadam (born 5 January ) is director of various video albums, ad films, TV serials and Marathi feature films as well as an actor and producer. Born and brought up in Mumbai, Maharashtra received a Bachelor of Arts degree from Mumbai University He became a director and actor who has accumulated many years of experience on Marathi stage and feature films. His upcoming movie Waakya was screened at Navi Mumbai International Film Festival. As well as "Best social issue film award" in "NIFF".In Sawnskruti kala Darpan film was nominated.later on film was selected in Maharashtra government Award.
"NAGARSEVAK Ek Nayak"Megha star block buster movie successfully released 31 march 2017
13 Oct.2017 Waakya 21 awarded movie released..
And "ATROCITY" block buster movie released 23 Feb 2018...
Collection of ATROCITY was 3.15 cr.its on social base movie.
PURASHA*
Award-winning movie Directed by 
Deepak dattaram kadam

Filmography

Early life
 Worked with one of the media ad agency, Hindustan Thomsion Associates – Falcrum Division; in Commercial Dept. (1995 to 2000)
 Shiv Communication As Marketing Partner (2000 to 2001)
 Proprietor of On Air Entertainment, which deals into event management, AD Making, production & media marketing (2000)

Theater
 Karmabhog(For Marathi Rajya Natya Spardha award-winning drama)
 Tujhi Ti Majhi(comedy play)

Director

Television

TV AD film director
 working for hindusthan lever with H.T.A.(Fulcrum)
 Body Line Lingerie For M/S Suresh Parmar(Undergarments Products)
 Pinch Non Alcoholic Beer For M/S Pinch Botteling Company Pvt.Ltd(2000)
 Jatra Hotels Pvt.Ltd.Nasik(2001 )
 Sha Dhanaji Poonamchand Jewellers Pvt.Ltd(2000)

Video album director
 Marathi Remix Lavanya (For Padmini Cassettes Pvt.Ltd.)

References

Film directors from Mumbai
Living people
1981 births